Saadat Qoli may refer to:
 Saadat Qoli-ye Olya
 Saadat Qoli-ye Sofla